Marijan Čabraja (born 25 February 1997) is a Croatian professional football player who plays as a left-back for Scottish Premiership side Hibernian.

Club career
Čabraja made his Prva HNL debut for Gorica on 11 August 2018 in a game against Inter Zaprešić.

On 1 February 2021, he signed for Dinamo Zagreb.

On 13 July 2022, Čabraja signed a three-year deal with Scottish Premiership side Hibernian.

International career
Čabraja represented Croatia U19 at the 2016 UEFA European Under-19 Championship.

References

External links
 

1997 births
Living people
Sportspeople from Pula
Croatian footballers
Croatia youth international footballers
Croatia under-21 international footballers
Association football fullbacks
GNK Dinamo Zagreb II players
HNK Gorica players
GNK Dinamo Zagreb players
Ferencvárosi TC footballers
NK Olimpija Ljubljana (2005) players
Hibernian F.C. players
First Football League (Croatia) players
Croatian Football League players
Nemzeti Bajnokság I players
Slovenian PrvaLiga players
Scottish Professional Football League players
Croatian expatriate footballers
Croatian expatriate sportspeople in Hungary
Expatriate footballers in Hungary
Croatian expatriate sportspeople in Slovenia
Expatriate footballers in Slovenia
Croatian expatriate sportspeople in Scotland
Expatriate footballers in Scotland